Isaac F Wales (31 January 1865 – 11 January 1949) was an Australian cricketer. Primarily a wicket-keeper, he played 16 first-class cricket matches for New South Wales between 1886 and 1894, taking 28 catches, stumping 5 batsmen and scoring 121 runs.

See also
 List of New South Wales representative cricketers

References

External links
 

1865 births
Australian cricketers
New South Wales cricketers
1949 deaths